Wojciech Ferens (born 5 April 1991) is a Polish professional volleyball player. At the professional club level, he plays for Cuprum Lubin.

Career

National team
On 2 April 2015 was appointed to the Polish national team by head coach Stephane Antiga. After the training camp in Spała he went to team B of Polish national team led by Andrzej Kowal. He took part in 1st edition of 2015 European Games. On 14 August 2015 he achieved first medal as senior national team player – bronze of European League. His national team won 3rd place match with Estonia (3–0).

Honours

Clubs
 National championships
 2017/2018  Polish Cup, with Trefl Gdańsk

Youth national team
 2009  European Youth Olympic Festival

Universiade
 2013  Summer Universiade

References

External links
 
 Player profile at PlusLiga.pl 
 Player profile at Volleybox.net

1991 births
Living people
People from Radom
Sportspeople from Masovian Voivodeship
Polish men's volleyball players
European Games competitors for Poland
Volleyball players at the 2015 European Games
Universiade medalists in volleyball
Universiade silver medalists for Poland
Medalists at the 2013 Summer Universiade
AZS Olsztyn players
ZAKSA Kędzierzyn-Koźle players
BBTS Bielsko-Biała players
BKS Visła Bydgoszcz players
Trefl Gdańsk players
AS Cannes Volley-Ball players
Jastrzębski Węgiel players
Warta Zawiercie players
Cuprum Lubin players
Outside hitters